Bevern is a Samtgemeinde ("collective municipality") in the district of Holzminden, in Lower Saxony, Germany. Its seat is in the town Bevern.

The Samtgemeinde Bevern consists of the following municipalities:

 Bevern
 Golmbach 
 Holenberg 
 Negenborn

References